Haider Al-Ameri (born 29 May 1997) is a Saudi professional footballer who plays for Al-Rawdhah as a right back.

Career
Al-Ameri started his career with Al-Adalah where he was promoted from the youth team to the first team in 2018. Al-Ameri helped Al-Adalah reach the Pro League, the top tier of Saudi football, for the first time in the club's history. On 25 January 2020, Al-Ameri joined MS League club Al-Bukayriyah on loan until the end of the 2019–20 season. On 6 October 2020, Al-Ameri joined MS League club Al-Khaleej.

References

1997 births
Living people
Saudi Arabian footballers
Al-Adalah FC players
Al-Bukayriyah FC players
Khaleej FC players
Al-Rawdhah Club players
Association football fullbacks
Saudi First Division League players
Saudi Professional League players
Saudi Second Division players
Saudi Arabian Shia Muslims